The Rudnik District, or simply Rudnik, is a district of the City Municipality of Ljubljana, the capital of Slovenia. It is named after the former village of Rudnik.

Geography
The Rudnik District is bounded on the northwest by the Ljubljanica River, on the northeast by the crest of Golovec Hill, and on the south by the A2 Freeway and a line running through the Ljubljana Marsh. The district includes the former village of Rudnik and the marsh hamlets of Ilovica, Volar, Pri Strahu, Pri Maranzu, Kožuh, and Havptmance.

References

External links

Rudnik District on Geopedia
Rudnik District homepage

 
Districts of Ljubljana